Scott M. Pollard (born 1970) is an American attorney and one-term Democratic member of the Rhode Island House of Representatives, representing the 40th District since 2 January 2009. During the 2009-2010 sessions, he served on the House Committees on Judiciary and Separation of Powers. Pollard was defeated for reelection in the 2 November 2010 general elections to Michael W. Chippendale

References

External links
Rhode Island House - Representative Scott Pollard official RI House website

Democratic Party members of the Rhode Island House of Representatives
Rhode Island lawyers
1970 births
Living people
People from Providence County, Rhode Island